The Dr. Willis Meriwether House, also known as the Clark-Malone House, is a historic vernacular Greek Revival style house in Eutaw, Alabama, United States.  The house is a two-story wood-framed building on a brick foundation, six square box columns span the front portico.  It was built in 1856 by Dr. Willis Meriwether.  The house was recorded by the Historic American Buildings Survey in 1934.  It was added to the National Register of Historic Places as a part of the Antebellum Homes in Eutaw Thematic Resource on April 2, 1982, due to its architectural significance.

References

National Register of Historic Places in Greene County, Alabama
Houses on the National Register of Historic Places in Alabama
Houses completed in 1836
Greek Revival houses in Alabama
Houses in Greene County, Alabama